St. Michael Vocational School, also referred to by its acronym MICO (Michael's College), is a private Catholic secondary school and vocational training centre (SMK), located in Surakarta, Central Java, Indonesia. The school was founded by the Indonesian Province of the Society of Jesus in 1962. 

The school has two divisions: the Academy of Mechanical Engineering Industry (ATMI St. Michael) and Michael Vocational High School (SMK St. Michael). St. Michael is supported by the Karya Bakti Foundation Surakarta which also supports ATMI Surakarta and ATMI Cikarang.

See also

 Catholic Church in Indonesia
 Education in Indonesia
 List of Jesuit schools

References

External links 
 ATMI Indonesia 
 SMK Mikael website

Jesuit secondary schools in Indonesia
Vocational education in Indonesia
Education in Central Java
Educational institutions established in 1987
1987 establishments in Indonesia
Buildings and structures in Surakarta